William Flemming (born April 3, 1979, in Alexandria, Virginia) is an American sportscaster who broadcasts play-by-play of Boston Red Sox games with the WEEI Red Sox Radio Network alongside veteran announcer Joe Castiglione;  Prior to joining WEEI in 2019, Flemming served as the play-by-play voice of the Pawtucket Red Sox, the team’s Triple A affiliate. Flemming also has experience calling a wide range of sports including college basketball and hockey for ESPN and CBS Sports.

In addition Flemming has worked for FOX Sports, Turner Broadcasting, the IUPUI men's basketball team, as well as the Indianapolis Indians, Potomac Nationals and Lancaster JetHawks baseball teams.

Flemming has a B.A. from Stanford University in Spanish literature. His brother Dave Flemming is a broadcaster for the San Francisco Giants and ESPN.

References

1980 births
Living people
American radio sports announcers
Boston Red Sox announcers
College basketball announcers in the United States
College hockey announcers in the United States
Major League Baseball broadcasters
Minor League Baseball broadcasters
Sportspeople from Alexandria, Virginia
Stanford University alumni